The Topoke people (sometimes incorrectly called Eso people) are an ethnic group that live in the Isangi Territory south of the Congo River, downstream from Kisangani in Tshopo District of the Democratic Republic of the Congo.
They speak the Poke language (also called Puki, Tofoke, Topoke or Tovoke), in the Soko–Kele languages group of Bantu languages.

Location

The Topoke are one of the three main ethnic groups in the Isangi territory. The other two are the Lokele and Turumbu.
Their main territory is between 0° and 2° South, 23° and 25° East. The heart of the territory is in the angle formed by the Congo and  Lomami rivers. Ilambi is one of their communities.
Another group of Topoke people is located in the Yalikandja-Yanonge sector.
This group, commonly known as the "Topoke of Likolo" is due to population movements caused by the penetration of Arab slavers into the region.

The Topoke may have originated to the north of the Congo River, in the Ubangi-Uele basin. They would have abandoned this territory when threatened by the Baboa and Zande people. During their march to the south, they would have first settled on the right bank of the Congo River around the lower Aruwimi. From there they crossed the river to settle in their current territory, having driven the original Bangando and Bambole inhabitants further south.
There are cultural affinities between the Topoke and the Mongandu and Bambole peoples.

According to the 1984 Census, the Topoke accounted for 52.38% (128,613 out of 245,548 total inhabitants) of the population of the Isangi area.

Pre-colonial culture

Music and dance played important roles in Topoke culture, and music in particular reached a high level of sophistication.
The Topoke people had a long tradition of large regional markets, where purchases could be made on credit or by using iron javelins as currency.
Non-payment of debts periodically led to fighting, in which the javelins were used as weapons.
The lances were called ndoa by some Topoke, the Lokele word for marriage.
Thirty of them would buy a male slave, while forty or more would be needed for a female.
The Topoke were polygynous, and it was common for an important visitor to be offered female companionship as well as food and shelter. This practice persisted well into the colonial era.
However, sometimes sexual abuse of Topoke women by colonial administrators led to retaliation such as poisoning attempts by their husbands.

Colonial era and later

The Lomami Company was formed in 1898 and in 1899 started forcing the local people to harvest rubber.
In 1905 two white officers of the Company were killed by warriors of Yaboila.
Mr. Pimpurnaux, former District Commissioner of Aruwimi, led punitive expeditions.
One of the Topoke men accused of the murder was hung at Basoko in November 1905.
Some Topoke families in the Mongo block at Bondombe, in the Tshuapa basin on the equator, are descended from  Topoke who fled the 1905 expeditions.
Resistance to work as rubber harvesters was widespread, with the men retreating to hiding places in the marshes to avoid being forcibly recruited for work that they equated with slavery during the period of Arab occupation.

The Topoke were relatively isolated from missionary activity and wage earning until the 1930s.
After World War II they began to move to Kisangani to work as unskilled laborers, but were at a disadvantage compared to more established urban groups. However, by 1975 many had become businessmen, intellectuals and university students.

References

Sources

External link

Ethnic groups in the Democratic Republic of the Congo